The Kavkazskiy kalendar was an annual almanac published in Tiflis (present-day Tbilisi) in the Russian Empire by the office of the Viceroy of the Caucasus, published between 1846 and 1917.

History 
The Kavkazskiy kalendar contained a large number of ethnographic and historical materials. Questions of public education, agricultural crops were considered, information about the customs of the Caucasian peoples, their religions, and much more was placed. In addition, there was the so-called "Chronological indication" section, containing a chronological list of significant dates in the history of the Caucasus since ancient times. A significant place in it was also given to statistical (including data on the population of the region), reference and address information about the Caucasus region, including the Dagestan, Kuban and Terek oblasts, as well as the Black Sea and Stavropol governorates.

The Kavkazskiy kalendar enjoyed great interest among the population. The correspondent of the newspaper  noted: "Every year the people look forward to the next edition of the Kavkazskiy kalendar." It was also used as a guide and essential reference book by travellers, explorers and various persons sent to the Caucasus.

References

Bibliography

External links 
 Kavkazskiy kalendar for 1846
 Kavkazskiy kalendar for 1917

Publications established in 1846
Publications disestablished in 1917